Acacia polifolia is a shrub belonging to the genus Acacia and the subgenus Phyllodineae that is native to parts of eastern Australia.

Description
Like most species of Acacia it has phyllodes rather than true leaves. When it blooms it produces racemose inflorescences that have spherical flower-heads containing 15 to 20 bright lemon yellow to golden coloured flowers.

Distribution
It is found in parts of the Great Dividing Range in Queensland from around Jericho and Tambo in the west out to around Biloela in the east growing in shallow sandy soils over and around sandstone as a part of Eucalyptus woodland communities.

See also
 List of Acacia species

References

polifolia
Flora of New South Wales
Flora of Queensland
Plants described in 1980
Taxa named by Leslie Pedley